USS Valley Forge may refer to:

  was an Essex-class aircraft carrier, commissioned in 1946, converted to an amphibious assault ship (LPH-8) and decommissioned in 1970
  was a  guided missile cruiser commissioned in 1986 and decommissioned in 2004

United States Navy ship names
Valley Forge